Nasir Rasool (born 7 October 1993) is an Indian cricketer. He made his Twenty20 debut on 11 November 2019, for Jammu & Kashmir in the 2019–20 Syed Mushtaq Ali Trophy.

References

External links
 

1993 births
Living people
Indian cricketers
Jammu and Kashmir cricketers
Place of birth missing (living people)